The Real Housewives of Potomac (abbreviated RHOP) is an American reality television series that premiered on January 17, 2016, on Bravo. It has aired seven seasons and focuses on the personal and professional lives of several women living in and around Potomac, Maryland.

The cast of the recent seventh season consists of Gizelle Bryant, Ashley Darby, Robyn Dixon, Karen Huger, Candiace Dillard Bassett, Wendy Osefo, and Mia Thornton, with former housewife Charrisse Jackson-Jordan and newcomer Jacqueline Blake serving as "friends of the housewives". Other previously featured cast members include Katie Rost and Monique Samuels.

Overview

Seasons 1–3
Initially titled Potomac Ensemble, The Real Housewives of Potomac was announced on November 11, 2015. The series is the network's second attempt to develop a reality series based in the Washington, D.C. area. The first effort was The Real Housewives of D.C., which aired in 2010 and was canceled after one season.

The first season premiered on January 17, 2016, and starred Gizelle Bryant, Ashley Darby, Robyn Dixon, Karen Huger, Charrisse Jackson-Jordan and Katie Rost. After the filming for the second season began, Rost was fired from the show. Monique Samuels was then added to the cast for the second season which premiered on April 2, 2017.

The third season premiered on April 1, 2018, with Candiace Dillard Bassett joining the cast and Jordan appearing in a "friend" capacity. Jordan left the show after the third season.

Seasons 4–present 
The fourth season, which began filming in August 2018, premiered on May 5, 2019. The season featured Dillard's wedding and Rost as a "friend of the housewives." It also marked as Rost's final appearance of the season after not being invited to the fourth season's reunion taping.

The fifth season premiered on August 2, 2020, with Wendy Osefo as the newest cast member and Jackson Jordan appearing as a guest. In December 2020, Samuels announced her departure from the series.

The sixth season premiered on July 11, 2021, with new housewife Mia Thornton and friend of the housewives Askale Davis joining.

The seventh season premiered on October 9, 2022, with Davis departing, former housewife Charrisse Jackson-Jordan returning as a friend of the housewives, alongside Jacqueline Blake. Former cast members Rost and Davis both made a guest appearance.

Cast Members

Timeline of cast members

Episodes

Reception

Viewership
The premiere episode of The Real Housewives of Potomac received a 1.2 rating in adults 1849 years adult demographic and 2.54 million viewers in total, according to Nielsen Media Research's "live plus-3" estimates. The episode was the highest-rated premiere of any series of The Real Housewives franchise. The first season of the series averaged 2.1 million viewers in the "live plus-3" estimates, becoming the network's most-watched first season of a series since The Real Housewives of Beverly Hills in 2010.

Critical response
The reality series has received mostly positive reviews from television critics. Amy Amatangelo, writing for The Hollywood Reporter, said, "Like its predecessors, The Real Housewives of Potomac offers escapist TV at the highest level," and also added, "You can watch with the comfort that you would never behave this way and delight in all the ridiculous shenanigans." Amatangelo praised the show's diversity by saying that the network aims for the franchise to be "an equal-opportunity offender". Joi-Marie McKenzie of ABC News, reviewing the show's premiere, said, "Between the show introductions, there was plenty of shade-throwing and one-liners to keep "Housewives" enthusiasts entertained."

Controversy
During the fifth season of RHOP, cast member Monique Samuels got into a physical altercation with co-star Candiace Dillard Bassett. Samuels and Dillard Bassett were both charged with second-degree assault in Maryland's District Court of Montgomery County. Both women appeared in court, and all charges were dropped.  Samuels did not return to The Real Housewives of Potomac for its sixth season due to mistreatment from the producers.

References

External links

 
 
 

 
2010s American reality television series
2020s American reality television series
2016 American television series debuts
Bravo (American TV network) original programming
English-language television shows
Potomac, Maryland
Television series by Endemol
Television shows set in Maryland
Women in Maryland